Crocodile Dundee (stylized as "Crocodile" Dundee in the U.S.) is a 1986 action comedy film set in the Australian Outback and in New York City. It stars Paul Hogan as the weathered Mick Dundee, and American actress Linda Kozlowski as reporter Sue Charlton. Inspired by the true-life exploits of Rod Ansell, the film was made on a budget of under $10 million as a deliberate attempt to make a commercial Australian film that would appeal to a mainstream American audience, but proved to be a worldwide phenomenon.

Released on 30 April 1986 in Australia, and on 26 September in the United States, it was the highest-grossing film of all-time in Australia, the highest-grossing Australian film worldwide, the second-highest-grossing film in the United States in 1986, the highest-grossing non-US film at the US box office ever and the second-highest-grossing film worldwide for the year. There are two versions of the film: the Australian version, and an international version, which had much of the Australian slang replaced with more commonly understood terms, and was slightly shorter. As the first film in the Crocodile Dundee film series, it was followed by two sequels: Crocodile Dundee II (1988) and Crocodile Dundee in Los Angeles (2001), although both films failed to match the critical success of the original.

Plot
Sue Charlton is a feature writer for her father's newspaper Newsday, and is dating the editor Richard Mason. She travels to Walkabout Creek, a small township in the Northern Territory of Australia, to meet Michael J. "Crocodile" Dundee, a bushman reported to have lost half a leg to a saltwater crocodile before crawling hundreds of miles to safety. On arrival in Walkabout Creek, she cannot locate Dundee, but she is entertained at the local pub by Dundee's business partner Walter "Wally" Reilly. When Dundee arrives that night, Sue finds his leg is not missing, but he has a large scar which he refers to as a "love bite". While Sue dances with Dundee, a group of city kangaroo shooters make fun of Dundee's status as a crocodile hunter, causing him to knock the leader out with one punch.

At first, Sue finds Dundee less "legendary" than she had been led to believe, unimpressed by his pleasant-mannered but uncouth behaviour and clumsy advances towards her. She is later amazed, when in the outback, she witnesses "Mick" (as Dundee is called) subduing a water buffalo, taking part in an Aboriginal (Pitjantjatjara) tribal dance ceremony, killing a snake with his bare hands, and scaring away the kangaroo shooters from the pub from their cruel sport by tricking them into thinking one of the kangaroos is shooting back.

The next morning, offended by Mick's assertion that as a "sheila" she is incapable of surviving the Outback alone, Sue goes out alone to prove him wrong but takes his rifle with her at his request. Mick follows her to make sure she is okay, but when she stops at a billabong to collect water, she is attacked by a large crocodile and is rescued by Mick. Overcome with gratitude, Sue finds herself becoming attracted to him.

Sue invites Mick to return with her to New York City on the pretext of continuing the feature story. At first Wally scoffs at her suggestion, but he changes his mind when she tells him the newspaper would cover all expenses. Once in New York, Mick is perplexed by local behaviour and customs but overcomes problematic situations including two encounters with a pimp and two attempted robberies. After this Sue realises her true feelings for him, and they kiss.

At a society dinner at her father's home in honour of Sue's safe return and of Mick's visit, Richard proposes marriage to Sue, and in a haze of confused emotions, she initially accepts in spite of Richard having recently revealed his self-centered and insensitive "true colours" during a period of intoxication.

Mick, disheartened at Sue's engagement, decides to go "walkabout" around the United States, but Sue has a change of heart and, deciding not to marry Richard, follows Mick to a subway station. There, she cannot reach him through the crowd on the platform, but has members of the crowd relay her message to him, whereupon he climbs up to the rafters and walks to Sue on the heads and raised hands of the onlookers and kisses her, to the delight of the crowd, where they receive a round of applause.

Cast

 Paul Hogan as Michael J. "Crocodile" Dundee
 Linda Kozlowski as Sue Charlton
 John Meillon as Walter Reilly
 David Gulpilil as Neville "Nev" Bell
 Mark Blum as Richard Mason
 Michael Lombard as Sam Charlton
 Reginald VelJohnson as Gus
 Terry Gill as Duffy
 Steve Rackman as Donk
 Gerry Skilton as Nugget
 David Bracks as Burt (roo shooter)
 Peter Turnbull as Trevor
 Rik Colitti as Danny
 Christine Totos as Rosita
 Graham 'Grace' Walker as Angelo
 Caitlin Clarke as Simone
 Nancy Mette as Karla
 John Snyder as Pimp
 Anne Carlisle as Gwendoline
 Anne Francine as Fran
 Paige Matthews as Party Girl
 Paul Greco as New Yorker
 Sullivan Walker as Tall Man

Production
The idea to make the film came to Paul Hogan (the lead actor and one of the story writers) when he was in New York. He wondered what it would be like if a Northern Territory bushman arrived in town. As Paul Hogan said:

The film's budget was raised through the 10BA tax concessions via Morgan Sharebrokers. Paul Hogan used his regular collaborators from TV, including John Cornell, Peter Faiman and Ken Shadie. Linda Kozlowski was imported to play the American reporter; Actors' Equity Australia objected to this but eventually relented.

Principal photography began on 13 July 1985. The first scenes were filmed in the small town of McKinlay in Queensland, where the hotel used has original warped and polished hardwood floors. Production decided to shoot in Kakadu National Park at the end of the dry season since crocodiles were less active in the filming locations. Areas such as Gunlom Falls, also known as the UDP Falls back in the 1980's, are also featured in the movie. The crocodile attack scene was filmed in Girraween Lagoon, just out of Darwin. Six weeks of filming were spent working out of Jaja, an abandoned uranium mining camp in Kakadu National Park in the Northern Territory with an additional week in Cloncurry. There was a further six weeks filming in New York City (including Newark Liberty International Airport, which serves the city). Filming wrapped on 11 October. 

When the filming finished, Hogan said he expected it would make millions of dollars around the world. Hogan also said of the film: "I'm planning for it to be Australia's first proper movie. I don't think we've had one yet—not a real, general public, successful, entertaining movie". Crocodile Dundee was offered to 20th Century Fox and Warner Bros. for North American release before Paramount picked it up for US$6 million.

Reception

Box office
Crocodile Dundee opened with a record A$2,047,026 in its first week in Australia. It went on to gross A$47,707,045 at the box office in Australia and was the highest-grossing film of all-time there after 11 weeks, surpassing E.T. The Extra-Terrestrial.

A number of minor changes were made to the film for its US release where it was released theatrically by Paramount Pictures in September 1986. The film debuted at number 1 grossing US$$8 million in its opening weekend, and remained at number one for nine weeks. It grossed US$174,803,506 at the U.S. and Canadian box office being the second-highest-grossing film that year for both the studio and at the United States box office. Box Office Mojo estimates that the film sold over 46 million tickets in North America. It was the highest-grossing film in New Zealand with a gross of $5.1 million and the highest-grossing in Ireland with a gross of $2.8 million. The film was the highest-grossing non-American film at the US box office.

The film was a worldwide box office hit grossing US$328 million and surpassed Mad Max 2 as the highest-grossing Australian film at the worldwide box office.

Critical response
On Rotten Tomatoes, the film holds an approval rating of 88% based on 34 reviews, and an average rating of 6.8/10. The critics' consensus reads: "Infectiously easygoing charm and a leading man in the role he was born to play help Crocodile Dundee make the most of its familiar fish-out-of-water premise". On Metacritic the film has a score of 62% based on reviews from 13 critics, indicating "generally favorable reviews". Audiences polled by CinemaScore gave the film an average rating of "B+" on an A+ to F scale.

Roger Ebert gave the film 2 stars out of 4 and wrote: "All of the cliches are in the right places, most of the gags pay off and there are moments of real amusement as the Australian cowboy wanders around Manhattan as a naive sightseer. The problem is that there's not one moment of chemistry between the two stars: Paul Hogan as 'Crocodile' Dundee and Linda Kozlowski as the clever little rich girl. The movie feels curiously machine-made, as if they had all the right ingredients and simply forgot to add the animal magnetism". Nina Darnton of The New York Times thought that Paul Hogan was "delightful" in the title role, that the screenplay was "witty, with a fine sense of irony and the gift at poking fun at its own conceits", and that "Linda Kozlowski plays the reporter, Sue, very well", virtues which "go a long way toward compensating for the film's illogical plot and set-up situations". Variety stated that director Peter Faiman "has problems with the pacing and a script (by Hogan and longtime tv colleague Ken Shadie) that has its flat, dull spots. Hogan is comfortable enough playing the wry, irreverent, amiable Aussie that seems close to his own persona, and teams well with Kozlowksi, who radiates lots of charm, style and spunk". Dave Kehr of the Chicago Tribune gave the film 3 stars out of 4 and wrote: "Handsomely directed by Peter Faiman, the film punches most of the right buttons at most of the right times and emerges as an effective crowd-pleaser". Paul Attanasio of The Washington Post said that the film "has a double 'fish out of water' structure—first she's the fish, then he's the fish—but the movie doesn't go anywhere with it, mostly because the characters are such nullities ... There's no drama in 'Crocodile Dundee' because there's no real conflict between these characters". Michael Wilmington of the Los Angeles Times wrote that the film "is nothing you can examine deeply or mull over afterward. It's simply an expert crowd-pleaser. It has such a sure, easy, confident touch that it's almost failure-proof—like a tip of the hat, a sip of beer, a quick, golden 'G'day'". Monthly Film Bulletin called it "as dull and lumbering as its hero".

Although Crocodile Dundee was a hit both in Australia and abroad, it became controversial with some Australian critics and audiences who resented the image of Australians as being ocker. Robert Hughes complained in 2000 that to Americans "Crocodile Dundee is a work of social realism", giving them a Wild West' fantasy" about Australia. David Droga said in 2018, however, that "there has been no better ad for Australia than that movie".

The film became the first in the Crocodile Dundee series, with two sequels and a Super Bowl commercial.

Later reviews 
In 2018, The Guardian said any reboot of the film that aimed to embrace the tone of the original would need to be "vulgar and witless, the new film would need to be sexist, racist, homophobic and transphobic. It would need to have awkward jokes unfunny at the time of release and even less amusing when revisited years later". The article goes on to identify moments of sexual assault in the film played for comedy.

Medium published a retrospective review in 2021 saying, "35 years later, the film is nothing but an offensive embarrassment" and "wildly offensive on practically every front" with an "onslaught of racism, sexism, homophobia and transphobia".At one point, Mick Dundee, played by co-writer Paul Hogan, compares the issue of Indigenous land rights to "fleas" debating "who owns the dog". He later sexually assaults a transwoman in public after his friend tells him "It's a guy" and the word "faggot" is thrown around amidst laughter, mocking and a crowd who cheer the assault on.

Accolades

Release

Broadcasts
Crocodile Dundee remains the single most-viewed Christmas Day film or programme in the United Kingdom when it debuted on 25 December 1989 on BBC One, with an audience of 21.8 million.

Sequel

A sequel titled Crocodile Dundee II was released in 1988.

References

External links

 
 
 
 
 Crocodile Dundee at Oz Movies
 Crocodile Dundee at the National Film and Sound Archive

 
1980s action comedy films
1980s adventure films
1986 romantic comedy films
1986 films
20th Century Fox films
1980s adventure comedy films
APRA Award winners
Australian comedy films
Australian independent films
Australian romantic comedy films
American action comedy films
American independent films
American romantic comedy films
Films directed by Peter Faiman
Films featuring a Best Musical or Comedy Actor Golden Globe winning performance
Films set in New York City
Films set in the Northern Territory
Films shot in New York City
Films shot in Queensland
Films shot in Sydney
Films shot in the Northern Territory
Films scored by Peter Best (composer)
Paramount Pictures films
Films set in the Outback
1986 directorial debut films
1980s English-language films
1980s American films